Mauro Ángel Maidana (born 12 July 1990) is an Argentine professional footballer who plays as a left-back for Independiente Rivadavia.

Career
Unión Santa Fe were Maidana's first senior team. After making his debut in August 2009 against Gimnasia y Esgrima, he scored his first goal in the following October during a victory at home to Olimpo. In total, Maidana was selected in ninety-five fixtures in all competitions for Unión Santa Fe. Douglas Haig completed the loan signing of Maidana ahead of the 2016 Primera B Nacional. Nineteen appearances followed, which preceded him returning to his parent club but subsequently departing permanently to Independiente Rivadavia. Maidana remained for two seasons, 2016–17 & 2017–18, scoring once in forty-eight games.

On 4 July 2018, Maidana joined Primera División side Argentinos Juniors. His first appearance arrived a month later in a Copa Argentina tie with Defensa y Justicia. Just two further appearances would follow, prior to his departure in July 2019 to Mitre of Primera B Nacional. After twenty matches for them, Maidana moved across the division to All Boys in October 2020.

Career statistics
.

References

External links

1990 births
Living people
People from Esperanza, Santa Fe
Argentine footballers
Association football defenders
Primera Nacional players
Argentine Primera División players
Unión de Santa Fe footballers
Club Atlético Douglas Haig players
Independiente Rivadavia footballers
Argentinos Juniors footballers
Club Atlético Mitre footballers
All Boys footballers
Sportspeople from Santa Fe Province